is a city and port located in Nemuro Subprefecture, Hokkaido, Japan. It is the capital city of Nemuro Subprefecture. Much of the city lies on the Nemuro Peninsula. As of February 29, 2012, the city has an estimated population of 29,087, with 12,966 households, and a population density of 56.74 persons per km2 (147.0 persons per sq. mi.).

History
Nemuro was developed by fisheries. In the early Meiji period, it was the largest city in eastern Hokkaido.
1900 Nemuro town was founded.
1906 Wada village was founded.
1945 Bombed by American naval aircraft, 393 people were killed.
1915 Habomai village was founded.
1957 Nemuro town and Wada village was merged to form Nemuro city.
1959 Habomai village was merged into Nemuro city.

Climate
Nemuro, like most of Hokkaido, has a humid continental climate (Köppen climate classification Dfb), but not far from a marine climate (Koppen: Cfb) due to its low amplitude for a location close to mainland Asia and average temperatures during the winter. It has mild to warm summers and cold snowy winters. Like the more northerly Kuril Islands, it has an extremely strong seasonal lag, with the highest temperatures in August and September and lowest in February, though it is not so gloomy as extremely foggy North Pacific islands like Simushir or the Aleutian Islands in general.

Transportation

Air
Nearby Nakashibetsu Airport serves Nemuro.

Rail
Hokkaido Railway Company – Nemuro Main Line
Stations in the city: Nemuro - Higashi-Nemuro - Nishi-Wada - Kombumori - Ochiishi - Bettoga - Attoko

Road
National Route 44
National Route 243

Sightseeing

Cape Nosappu
Cape Hanasaki, including "Kurumaishi", a car wheel-shaped stone natural monument
Cape Ochiishi, a fishing port
The Ruins of Chashi in the Nemuro Peninsula
Roadside station Swan 44 Nemuro
Lake Furen
Shunkunitai Wild Bird Sanctuary
Habomai Fishing Port
Kotohira Shrine
Meiji Park
Ohashi Bridge
Lake Onnetō

Cuisine
One local specialty of Nemuro is "escalope". This consists of tonkatsu (breaded deep-fried pork cutlets) over butter fried rice with a special demiglace sauce.

Nemuro is well known by the people of Hokkaido as the one of the best places to eat sushi because of the seafood caught there. Nemuro is also the origin of two sushi restaurants in Hokkaido: Matsuriya and Hanamaru. Nemuro's seafood delicacies include their fresh Pacific saury, salmon, king crab, and shrimp.

Other delicacies in Nemuro include yakitori bento, Holland sanbei (waffle-like snack), soft serve ice cream, and monjayaki.

Economy 
Nemuro's economy is based on its fishing industry as many types of marine animals are found in the area all year long. Dairy processing is also an important part of the local economy. Local businesses like restaurants and tourism also plays a significant role in the economy. Nemuro boasts the largest catches of saury in all of Japan, which has led to efforts to export saury to Southeast Asia, especially Vietnam.

Education

High schools
Hokkaido Nemuro High School

Mascot

He is a fisherman owl who stores seafood products in his pocket. He is asleep and usually sleep-walks during the day but is active during the night. He was unveiled in April 2016.

Sister cities
Nemuro is twinned with the following sister cities:
 Sitka, Alaska, United States
 Severo-Kurilsk, Russia
 Kurobe, Toyama, Japan
 Tebedu, Sarawak, Malaysia

References

External links

 
 Official Website 
 English Website

 
Port settlements in Japan
Populated coastal places in Japan